Tsaritsyn is a rural locality (a settlement) and the administrative center of Tsaritsynskoye Rural Settlement, Gorodishchensky District, Volgograd Oblast, Russia. The population was 1,059 as of 2010. There are 85 streets.

Geography 
Tsaritsyn is located 16 km southwest of Gorodishche (the district's administrative centre) by road. Studyono-Yablonovka is the nearest rural locality.

References 

Rural localities in Gorodishchensky District, Volgograd Oblast